Eugenius (died 6 September 394) was a usurper in the Western Roman Empire (392–394) against Emperor Theodosius I. While Christian himself, Eugenius capitalized on the discontent in the West caused by Theodosius' religious policies targeting pagans. He renovated the pagan Temple of Venus and Roma and restored the Altar of Victory, after continued petitions from the Roman Senate. Eugenius replaced Theodosius' administrators with men loyal to him, including pagans. This revived the pagan cause. His army fought the army of Theodosius at the Battle of the Frigidus, where Eugenius was captured and executed.

Life
A Christian and former teacher of grammar and rhetoric, as well as magister scriniorum, Eugenius was an acquaintance of Arbogast, the magister militum. Arbogast was of Frankish origin and de facto ruler of the western portion of the Empire.

Rise to power
Following the death of Valentinian II, Eugenius was elevated to augustus on 22 August 392 at Lyons, by Arbogast. Deferring to Eugenius offered Arbogast two strong advantages: first, Eugenius, a Roman and Christian, was more suitable than Arbogast, a Frank and pagan, as an Augustus; furthermore, the Roman Senate would be more likely to support Eugenius.

Civil, religious, and military policies
After being installed as Emperor, Eugenius changed the imperial administrators. When Theodosius had left the western half of the empire to Valentinian II, he had put his own men in the highest civil offices, to keep a strong grasp on the whole empire. Eugenius replaced these administrators with others loyal to himself, coming from the senatorial class. Virius Nicomachus Flavianus the Elder became praetorian prefect, his son Nicomachus Flavianus the Younger received the title of praefectus urbi, while the new praefectus annonae was Numerius Proiectus.

Though his actual beliefs are a matter of controversy among ancient and modern historians, Eugenius was at least publicly a Christian. Pagan senators convinced Eugenius to use public money to fund pagan projects, such as the rededication of the Temple of Venus and Roma and the restoration of the Altar of Victory within the Curia. Eugenius' appointment of Nicomachus Flavianus, a pagan, as Praetorian Prefect of Italy, revived the pagan cause. These religious policies created tension with pro-Christian figures, such as Emperor Theodosius and the powerful and influential Bishop Ambrose, who left his see in Milan when the imperial court of Eugenius arrived.

Eugenius was also successful in the military field, notably in the renovation of old alliances with Alamanni and Franks, even marching to the Rhine frontier, where he impressed and pacified the Germanic tribes by parading his army in front of them. After this display, he recruited Alamannic and Frankish units for his army.

Fall
After his election as emperor, Eugenius sent two embassies to Theodosius's court, asking for recognition of his election. Theodosius received them, but both embassies were given vague responses and returned without completing their missions.  In January 393, Theodosius promoted his eight-year-old son Honorius to the rank of Augustus of the West, giving the indication of the illegality of Eugenius' elevation.

Following the news of Honorius' elevation to Augustus, Eugenius and Arbogast marched their army, stripped from the Rhine frontier, into Italy in the spring of 393. Theodosius then moved from Constantinople with his army, and met Eugenius and Arbogast at the Battle of the Frigidus in the Vipava Valley,  on 6 September 394. The bloody battle lasted two days, and was marked by unusually strong winds, but in the end Theodosius won. Eugenius was captured and then executed, his head afterward being displayed in Theodosius' camp. Arbogast committed suicide the next day.

Notes

References

Sources

External links 
 
 Roberts, Walter, "Flavius Eugenius (392-394)", De Imperatoribus Romanis

4th-century births
4th-century Christians
4th-century murdered monarchs
4th-century Roman usurpers
4th-century Roman consuls
394 deaths
Ancient Roman generals
Executed Roman emperors
Imperial Roman consuls
People executed by the Roman Empire
Year of birth unknown